Joseph Adjei (born 20 August 1995) is a Ghanaian footballer who plays as a defender for Legon Cities. He has also represented the Ghana national under-20 football team.

Club career
Adjei began his professional football career at Wa All Stars in the First Capital Plus Premier League, Ghana's highest league. On 15 August 2016, it was announced that he had been signed on season-long loan deal by South African top-tier side Cape Town City, where he would play his first Premier Soccer League season in 2016–17.

On 17 September 2017, it was announced that he had joined with Oman-based club Al-Oruba SC on loan.

February 2018, Adjei switched teams and countries by agreeing to a contract with United Soccer League side OKC Energy FC.

Adjei signed for Malkiya Club in Bahrain on 7 October 2018.

Aizawl FC
In 2020, he joined the I-League side Aizawl FC on a one-year contract as a defender and appeared in 10 league matches as the club finished on 10th position.

Al-Diriyah
On 15 January 2022, Adjei joined Saudi First Division League side Al-Diriyah on loan.

International career
In 2015, Adjei was selected to represent Ghana at the 2015 FIFA U-20 World Cup in New Zealand. Ghana finished top of their group in the tournament above Austria, Argentina, and Panama. However, the team was eventually knocked-out by African counterparts, Mali.

He has also been named in the Ghana national team latest squad for Morocco and Côte d'Ivoire  friendlies.

References

External links

1995 births
Living people
Footballers from Accra
Ghanaian footballers
Ghana under-20 international footballers
Association football midfielders
Association football defenders
Place of birth missing (living people)
Legon Cities FC players
Cape Town City F.C. (2016) players
OKC Energy FC players
Malkiya Club players
Aizawl FC players
Al-Diriyah Club players
Oman Professional League players
Bahraini Premier League players
Saudi First Division League players
Expatriate footballers in Oman
Expatriate footballers in India
Expatriate footballers in Bahrain
Expatriate footballers in Saudi Arabia
Ghanaian expatriate sportspeople in Oman
Ghanaian expatriate sportspeople in India
Ghanaian expatriate sportspeople in Bahrain
Ghanaian expatriate sportspeople in Saudi Arabia